À la vie, à la mort ! is a 2002 double album recorded by French singer Johnny Hallyday. It was released on November 4, 2002 and achieved huge success in France and Belgium (Wallonia), where it topped the charts, and in Switzerland. It provided four top ten singles in France: "Marie" (#1), "Ne reviens pas" (#8), "L'Instinct" (#9) and "Je n'ai jamais pleuré" (#4). Many famous artists, such as Gérald De Palmas, Catherine Lara, Maxime Le Forestier, Patrick Bruel, Hugues Aufray, Stephan Eicher, Axel Bauer and Marc Lavoine, participated in the composition of the album.

Track listing

Source : Allmusic.

Releases

Charts and sales

Peak positions

End of year charts

Certifications and sales

References

2002 albums
Johnny Hallyday albums